Priyanka "Jeet" Toshi (born 30 April 1991) is an Indian mixed martial artist and boxer based in Bahrain. She is the first female MMA fighter to represent India professionally at ONE Championship in 2012. In 2019, she became the first female professional boxer to represent Bahrain at international level.

Early and personal life
Toshi started out competing in kickboxing competitions when she was 16 in Delhi.

Mixed martial arts career

ONE Championship
In 2012, Toshi became the first Indian fighter to sign with ONE Championship. She made her debut against Nicole Chua at War of the Lions in Singapore and lost the fight via rear-naked choke.

In 2015, Toshi got her first win in ONE by defeating Cambodia's Tharoth Sam at ONE Championship: Kingdom of Khmer via unanimous decision.

Boxing career
Toshi made her boxing debut for Bahrain on 5 November 2019 in the Sovereign Boxing Championship held at Dubai. She defeated India's Gisel Camoens and won the bout by unanimous decision.

In 2022, Toshi participated in the first edition of Bahrain's Domestic Boxing event held by Bahrain Boxing Federation and became the champion in the Women’s Elite 50kg category defeating her compatriot Jyoti Singh.

Mixed martial arts record 

|-
| Loss
| align=center| 4–4
| Haidy Ahmed
| TKO
| UAE Warriors 26: Arabia 6
| 
| align=center|1
| align=center|5:00
| Abu Dhabi, United Arab Emirates
|
|-
| Win
| align=center| 4–3
| Fatemeh Moslemi
| Decision (unanimous)
| Kumite 1 League
| 
| align=center|3
| align=center|5:00
| Mumbai, India
|
|-
| Loss
| align=center| 3–3
| Jenny Huang
| Submission (Arm-Triangle Choke)
| ONE: Unbreakable Warriors
| 
| align=center|1
| align=center|3:21
| Kuala Lumpur, Malaysia
|
|-
| Win
| align=center| 3–2
| Tharoth Sam
| Decision (unanimous)
| ONE: Kingdom of Khmer
| 
| align=center|3
| align=center|5:00
| Phnom Penh, Cambodia
|
|-
| Loss
| align=center| 2–2
| Jujeath Nagaowa
| TKO (Punches)
| ONE FC: Rise of Heroes
| 
| align=center|2
| align=center|1:07
| Manila, Philippines
|
|-
| Win
| align=center| 2–1
| Praveen Kalkal
| Submission (Rear-Naked Choke)
| Super Fight League 30-31
| 
| align=center|1
| align=center|1:06
| Mumbai, India
|
|-
| Loss
| align=center|1–1 
| Nicole Chua
| Submission (Rear Naked Choke) 
| ONE FC: War of the Lions
| 
| align=center|1
| align=center|2:07
| Kallang, Singapore
| 
|-
| Win
| align=center| 1–0
| Pooja Mehra
| Decision (unanimous)
| Full Contact Championship 5
| 
| align=center|3
| align=center|5:00
| Mumbai, India
|

Championships and accomplishments

Boxing
Clash of the Countries Sovereign Boxing Tournament
Sovereign Boxing Championship (2019)

Bahrain Domestic Boxing
Women’s Elite 50kg (2022)

See also 
 List of female mixed martial artists

References

External links
 

Living people
1991 births
Sportswomen from Delhi
Indian female mixed martial artists
Bahraini female mixed martial artists
Atomweight mixed martial artists
Mixed martial artists utilizing kickboxing
Mixed martial artists utilizing boxing
Indian women boxers
Bahraini women boxers
Indian female kickboxers
Bahraini female kickboxers
Indian emigrants to Bahrain
Indian expatriates in Bahrain
Sportspeople from Manama
Bantamweight boxers